West Hackney is a district in the London Borough of Hackney, situated on the eastern side of Ermine Street, the major Roman Road better known as the A10.

The area was part of the Ancient Parish and subsequent Metropolitan Borough of Hackney, but has come to be seen by many as an informal extension of Stoke Newington, as well as a sub-district of Hackney proper.

Rectory Road, the principal railway station, lies 4.3 miles (6.9 km) northeast of Charing Cross.

History

Early history 
The part of Hackney included the hamlet of Newington – entirely distinct from Stoke Newington – which lay between the Roman Road (now known as the A10) and the Common. The hamlet has now been absorbed into the wider urbanised area.

Newington was first recorded in the 1200s and was traditionally one of four Hackney hamlets (together with Dalston, Kingsland and Shacklewell) which were together rated as having, for taxation purposes, the same number of houses as the main 'Hackney Village'.

Chapel of ease 

The increasing population of the area saw it gain a chapel of ease in 1814, the church of St. James, designed by Robert Smirke in the Greek Doric style. The 1825 creation of the ecclesiastical parish of West Hackney saw St James elevated to the status of parish church.

WWI - London's first air raid 
The first bomb of the first air raid on London, a 190lb incendiary, fell on 16 Alkham Road on 31 May 1915. The German Army airship LZ 38 had begun the first assault on the capital by a foreign power since 1066. At that time William the Conqueror ravaged Southwark, then crossed the river upstream and ravaged much of the countryside around London in the days after that followed, with the area along Ermine Street (the A10) (including West Hackney) believed to have been badly affected.

The householder, Albert Lovell, had just returned home from posting a letter. The bomb bounced off his chimney and went through his roof, starting a fire on the upper storey. Mr Lovell, his wife, children and houseguests managed to escape the building, but the raid killed seven, including four children, in other parts of London, outraging public opinion.

East London was at particular risk at this time, due to the Kaiser's order, later rescinded, that the raiders limit their attacks to targets east of the Tower of London. An attack by Captain Lanoe Hawker of the Royal Flying Corps destroyed LZ 38 on the ground, at its base in Belgium a week later, but airship raids on London continued until 1917, with attacks from Gotha bombers in 1917-18.

WWII - Blitz 
West Hackney church was destroyed by enemy action in September 1940, during The Blitz. The remains were cleared away and replaced by a modern building, rededicated to St Paul, in 1960.

Post-war 
Jack ‘the Hat’ McVitie was killed at Evering Road by gangsters Ronnie and Reggie Kray. The murder was a significant factor in their subsequent downfall and imprisonment.

Administrative History
West Hackney has never been a civil administrative unit in its own right; it has always been an area of Hackney. 
Hackney was an administrative unit with consistent boundaries from the early Middle Ages to the creation of the larger modern borough in 1965. Hackney was based for many centuries on the Ancient Parish of Hackney.
Parishes in Middlesex were grouped into Hundreds, with Hackney part of Ossulstone Hundred. Rapid Population growth around London saw the Hundred split into several 'Divisions' during the 1600s, with Hackney part of the Tower Division (aka Tower Hamlets). The Tower Division was noteworthy in that the men of the area owed military service to the Tower of London - and had done even before the creation of the Division.

The Ancient Parishes provided a framework for both civil (administrative) and ecclesiastical (church) functions, but during the nineteenth century there was a divergence into distinct civil and ecclesiastical parish systems. In London the Ecclesiastical Parishes sub-divided to better serve the needs of a growing population, while the Civil Parishes continued to be based on the same Ancient Parish areas.

Under the London Government Act 1899, Hackney became a Metropolitan Borough, with the same boundaries as the pre-existing Civil Parish, with minor rationalisations in places to reflect modern street patterns rather than historic field boundaries and other features. There was a West Hackney electoral ward within that Borough.

The Ecclesiastical Parish (EP) of West Hackney was formed as a sub-division of the Ancient Parish. It merged with the EP of Shacklewell (also a part of Hackney) in 1958 to form the EP of West Hackney St Barnabas.

In 1965, Hackney merged with Shoreditch and Stoke Newington to form the new London Borough of Hackney.

Geography

Extent
There was formerly a West Hackney electoral ward in the Metropolitan Borough of Hackney, and there is an ecclesiastical parish of West Hackney, a sub-division of the wider Ancient Parish of Hackney. Both the ward and the ecclesiastical parish have used the A10 as the western boundary.

Despite these uses, it has never been an administrative unit in its own right, so lacks formal definition, except in that it has always taken Hackney's western boundary, the originally Roman A10 (in this area named Stoke Newington Road and Stoke Newington High Street - originally High Street, until a name change in 1937) as its own western boundary.

The core of the area lies between the A10 and the railway, but the area as a whole arguably extends further to the north-east.

Open Spaces
The largest open space in the area is Stoke Newington Common at 2.15 hectares. Originally known as Cockhangar Green it took its current name in the twentieth century.

West Hackney Recreation Ground is one hectare in extent and was originally the burial ground for St James's church (replaced, after bombing, by St Paul's church).

Transport
West Hackney is served by two railway stations; Rectory Road and Stoke Newington, the latter lying on the ill-defined borders Stoke Newington, West Hackney and Stamford Hill.

Notable People
Marc Feld, better known as Marc Bolan was born at the Eastern Fever Hospital and for his first fifteen years lived in a house facing the common. He attended Northwold School in nearby Upper Clapton.

References

Districts of the London Borough of Hackney
Areas of London